Michael Pittman may refer to:

Michael Pittman Sr. (born 1975), American football running back
Michael Pittman Jr. (born 1997), American football wide receiver